Mayonnaise is a compilation album by American band Deer Tick. It was released on February 1, 2019 through Partisan Records.

Track listing

Charts

References

2019 albums
Deer Tick (band) albums
Partisan Records albums